The school building on Castle Street in the Polish town of Miloslaw was a religious school, built in the neo-Gothic style in the 1840s. It became a hospital to treat wounded combatants during the Greater Poland Uprising of 1848, and was again involved in fighting around the time of the revolution of 1905-07.

Description 
Its address is 13 Castle Street.

The rooms contained in the school were as follows:
 9 classrooms,
 Teacher's lounge, 
 Secretariat,
 Office of the Director,
 Office of the Deputy Director, 
 Personnel office,
 Two utility rooms, 
 Bathroom.

Close to the school, at 19 Castle Street, is located a clergy house built during the years 1894–1895, and on the opposite side of the street is a former evangelical church. At the end of 2012 the school building was partially converted into social housing.

Bibliography
http://www.miloslaw.info.pl/content/mi%C5%82os%C5%82aw-stara-szko%C5%82|  
http://spmiloslaw.edupage.org/about|

Września County
Buildings and structures in Greater Poland Voivodeship
School buildings